The Port of Police  (in Polish generally Port Police) is a Polish seaport and deep water harbour in Police, Poland located on the west bank of the Oder River, off the Szczecin Lagoon.
It is the fourth-busiest port in the country.

In 2006, the cargo traffic in the seaport reached 2,445,500 tons, and it comprised 4.05% of all such traffic in Polish seaports.
In 2006, to the port passed 286 ships with a gross tonnage of over 100.

In January 2019 Port of Police and PKP have signed an agreement to create a direct railway link with the port to improve the delivery of the cargo. A direct track with accompanying infrastructure will be constructed from Police railway station to the seaport itself.

The Port of Police has access to the Baltic Sea through the Szczecin Lagoon, Świna strait.

References

External links 

 Port of Police authority website (English)

Police
Geography of West Pomeranian Voivodeship
Buildings and structures in West Pomeranian Voivodeship